The Lion and the Mouse is a lost 1914 silent film drama directed by Barry O'Neil and starring Ethel Clayton. It was produced by the Lubin Manufacturing Company of Philadelphia and distributed through the General Film Company. The film was adapted from the 1905 stage production The Lion and the Mouse by English playwright Charles Klein. Unfortunately, the master negative for the screen production was destroyed in the disastrous Lubin vault fire of 1914, along with the bulk of that studio's pre-1914 film collection.

Cast
Ethel Clayton - Shirley Rossmore, Sarah Green
Gaston Bell - Jefferson Ryder
George Soule Spencer - John Burkett Ryder
Bartley McCullum - Judge Rossmore
Robert Dunbar - Trust Lawyer
Eleanor Barry - Mrs. Rossmore
Lila Leslie - Mrs. Gordon (*as Lilie Leslie)
Richard Morris - Ex-Judge Scott
Carlotta Doti - Mrs. Ryder
Ruth Bryan - Kate Roberts
Walter C. Prichard -

References

External links
The Lion and the Mouse @ IMDb.com

1914 films
American silent feature films
American films based on plays
Lubin Manufacturing Company films
American black-and-white films
Silent American drama films
1914 drama films
Lost American films
1914 lost films
Lost drama films
Films directed by Barry O'Neil
1910s American films